Tabea Waßmuth (born 25 August 1996) is a German footballer who plays as a forward for Frauen-Bundesliga club VfL Wolfsburg and the Germany national team.

Club career
Waßmuth began her career with TSG 1899 Hoffenheim and won the German B-Junior Championship there in 2012. For the second half of the 2012/13 season, she was promoted to the second Hoffenheim team and achieved promotion to the 2nd Bundesliga for the first time in the summer of 2014. She made her debut in the Bundesliga in February 2015. With Hoffenheim, she appeared in 96 Bundesliga matches, scoring 28 goals.

Waßmuth signed to join VfL Wolfsburg in July 2021.  In her first season, she finished the group stage at the top of the scoring charts with 8 goals.  In May 2022, she extended her contract with Wolfsburg through June 2025.

International career
Waßmuth made her international debut for Germany on 22 September 2020, starting in the away match against Montenegro in the UEFA Euro 2022 qualifying, which finished as a 3–0 win. On 1 December 2020 in Dublin, she scored her first two international goals for Germany, in a 3–1 win over the Republic of Ireland, scoring 2-0 in the 29th minute and 3-1 in the 85th minute. 

Waßmuth was named in the Germany squad for the UEFA Euro 2022 by national coach Martina Voss-Tecklenburg. She played in four games in the tournament.

Career statistics

Scores and results list Germany's goal tally first, score column indicates score after each Waßmuth goal.

Honours
Germany

 UEFA Championship runner-up: 2022
 German B-Junior Football Championship: 2012
 Promotion to the 2nd Bundesliga: 2014
 German Football Championship: 2022
 German Cup: 2022

References

External links
 
 
 
 
 

1996 births
Living people
Sportspeople from Giessen
Footballers from Hesse
German women's footballers
Germany women's international footballers
Women's association football forwards
VfL Wolfsburg (women) players
TSG 1899 Hoffenheim (women) players
Frauen-Bundesliga players
2. Frauen-Bundesliga players
UEFA Women's Euro 2022 players